Europass can refer to:

 The old name for the Eurail Select Pass rail ticket
 Europass, a portfolio of five documents intended to standardise skill and qualification details for European citizens.
 The name of the official match ball design for the UEFA Euro 2008 soccer competition.
 A proposed mandatory identification for all European citizens in The Writing on the Wall (Yes Minister)